was a town located in Sakata District, Shiga Prefecture, Japan. Mount Ibuki dominates the town.

As of 2003, the town had an estimated population of 5,858 and a density of 53.66 persons per km2. The total area was 109.17 km2.

On February 14, 2005, Ibuki, along with the towns of Maihara and Santō (all from Sakata District), was merged to create the city of Maibara.

Dissolved municipalities of Shiga Prefecture
Maibara, Shiga